Teodora Drăgoescu (born 6 December 1986) is a Romanian footballer who plays as a defender. She has been a member of the Romania women's national team.

References

1986 births
Living people
Women's association football defenders
Romanian women's footballers
Sportspeople from Hunedoara
Romania women's international footballers
Apollon Ladies F.C. players
2. Frauen-Bundesliga players
Romanian expatriate footballers
Romanian expatriate sportspeople in Cyprus
Expatriate women's footballers in Cyprus
Romanian expatriate sportspeople in Germany
Expatriate women's footballers in Germany
CFF Clujana players